King Doniert's Stone consists of two pieces of a decorated 9th-century cross, near St Cleer on Bodmin Moor, Cornwall. The inscription is believed to commemorate Dungarth, King of Cornwall, who died around 875.

History
In the 5th century, Christianity was first brought to Cornwall by monks from Wales and Ireland. The early missionaries are believed to have erected wooden crosses to show places in which they had won victories for Christ. In time these places became sanctified and the wooden crosses were replaced by stone ones.

The site
The site consists of the remains of two granite cross-shaft fragments dating from the 9th–11th century, and an underground passage and cross-shaped chamber below the crosses, thought to be either the remains of tin workings or a possible oratory. The inscription translates as "Doniert has asked [for this to be made] for his soul[’s sake’]". It has a mortise slot and a plinth at the base.

Excavations
In 1849 the Exeter Diocesan Architectural Society carried out excavations around the stones and discovered a hidden vault beneath them. Mr Charles Spence published in the Transactions of that society a paper entitled Iter Cornubiense in which he details the proceedings of the work. After raising Doniert's stone and placing it in an erect position, a mass of granite no less than two tons and a half in weight, the workmen were directed to dig down by the side of the other monolith. After reaching a depth of about eight or nine feet a hole was discovered. Here they found a cruciform vault eighteen feet in length from east to west and sixteen from north to south the width of the vault being about four feet. The sides were perpendicular and the roof circular and all smoothed with a tool and as level as the rough nature of the naked rock would permit. The men employed for this task came from South Caradon mine. It was reported that the miners said that it was "nothing but old workings in other words ancient mine works."

The relationship between the underground chamber and the crosses is unknown.

The site is managed by the Cornwall Heritage Trust on behalf of English Heritage. Vehicles can park in a layby adjoining the site, entry is free and the site can be visited at any reasonable time during daylight hours.

See also

Pillar of Eliseg, a contemporary monument in the kingdom of Powys, Wales

References

External links
 English Heritage

Archaeological sites in Cornwall
English Heritage sites in Cornwall
High crosses in England
King Doniert's Stone
Monuments and memorials in Cornwall
Monumental crosses in England
9th-century inscriptions